Scott Brady (born Gerard Kenneth Tierney; September 13, 1924 – April 16, 1985) was an American film and television actor best known for his roles in Western films and as a ubiquitous television presence. He played the title role in the television series Shotgun Slade (1959-1961).

Early years
Gerard Kenneth Tierney was born in Brooklyn to Lawrence and Mary Alice (née Crowley) Tierney; his father was an Irish-American policeman who was chief of the New York City Aqueduct Police force. His older and younger brothers were fellow actors Lawrence and Edward Tierney, respectively. He took his screen name from a friend's short story in which the hero, a boxer, was named Scott Brady.

Brady was reared in suburban Westchester County, New York. He was nicknamed "Roddy" in his youth. He attended Roosevelt and St. Michael's high schools, where he lettered in basketball, football, and track.  He aspired to become a football coach or a radio announcer, but instead enlisted in the United States Navy before his graduation from high school. During World War II, he served as a naval aviation mechanic overseas on the USS Norton Sound.

Discharged in 1946, Brady headed to Los Angeles, where his older brother Lawrence was already making some progress as an actor. First taking menial jobs as a cab driver and a lumberjack, Brady studied at the Beverly Hills Drama School under his G.I. Bill of Rights. There, he studied acting and took vocal training to eliminate his thick Brooklyn accent. 

Brady had two brushes with scandal. In 1957, he was arrested for narcotics possession, but charges were dropped and he always maintained that he was framed. In 1963, he was barred by the New York State Harness Racing Commission from participation in the sport due to his association with known bookmakers. He also was involved in two lawsuits with Eagle-Lion Films in 1950. The studio sued Brady for $105,000, charging that he had failed to fulfill his contract's requirement of making two films a year for five years. Brady countersued for $510,000 in damages, saying that his career was damaged when Eagle-Lion suspended him.

Acting career

In 1948, Brady made his film debut as a boxer in the programmer In This Corner (1948) and took tough-guy roles in films like He Walked by Night, Undertow, and Canon City. He was the leading man in the romantic comedy The Model and the Marriage Broker and in the cult Western drama Johnny Guitar.

From 1953 to 1956, Brady appeared four times in different roles on Lux Video Theatre and appeared five times on The Ford Television Theatre. In 1955, he portrayed Ted Slater in "Man in the Ring" of The Loretta Young Show.  In 1955 and 1957, Brady appeared twice on Studio 57. Early in 1957, he was cast in "The Barbed Wire Preacher" of Crossroads.

On December 26, 1957, Brady played the frontier figure William Bent in the episode "Lone Woman" on Playhouse 90.

From 1955 to 1959, Brady appeared five times on Schlitz Playhouse, including the roles of Reno Cromwell in "Night of the Big Swamp" and Calvin Penny in "Papa Said No". The Schlitz Playhouse episode "The Salted Mine"  became the pilot for Brady's own Western television series Shotgun Slade, which aired 78 episodes in syndication from 1959 to 1961.

In addition to Shotgun Slade, Brady appeared in several other television Westerns, including Dick Powell's Zane Grey Theatre,  The High Chaparral, Lancer, Dirty Sally, The Virginian (twice), and Gunsmoke (three times).

In 1958, he played the lead role of Sergeant Matt Blake in Ambush at Cimarron Pass. He dated a number of actresses in Hollywood during this period, including Kipp Hamilton, Carol Ohmart, Reiko Sato, and  Shelley Winters.

In 1961, he played the roles of John Keller in "We're Holding Your Son" on General Electric Theater and Ernie Taggart in "Voyage into Fear" on Checkmate. In 1962, Brady was cast in the lead guest role as reporter/commentator Floyd Gibbons in "The Floyd Gibbons Story" of The Untouchables. The next year, he portrayed Bill Floyd in the episode "Run for Doom" of The Alfred Hitchcock Hour. In 1967, Brady guest-starred on Judd, for the Defense.

During the mid-1960s, Brady starred in several of A.C. Lyles' Western films. In 1969, he portrayed Budd Blake in the episode "Panic" of Bracken's World. That same year, he played John Harris in the episode “Log 102: We Can’t Just Walk Away From It” of Adam 12. Brady was cast as a corrupt US sergeant serving overseas in the film, $ (1971). In 1973, he was cast as Davey Collier in "No Stone Unturned" of Banacek. On December 5, 1974, Brady guest-starred in the season-one Movin' On TV episode "High Rollers" as a Vegas pit boss. From 1975 to 1977, Brady had the recurring role of Vinnie in 16 episodes of Police Story.

On February 15, 1977, he appeared as Shirley Feeney's father, Jack Feeney, in the episode "Buddy, Can You Spare a Father?" on ABC's Laverne & Shirley. Though he had turned down the role of Archie Bunker on All in the Family, Brady appeared as Joe Foley on four episodes in 1976. He appeared five times on The Rockford Files. In 1977, he portrayed Lou Caruso in "Caruso's Way" of Welcome Back, Kotter, and appeared as Matt Zaleski in the TV miniseries Wheels the following year.

Brady portrayed Capt. Scofield, in the 1981 made-for-TV film McClain's Law. In 1983, Brady portrayed Alex Kidd in "Shadow of Sam Penny" on Simon and Simon. Brady's last film acting role was as Sheriff Frank Reilly in the 1984 film Gremlins.

Death
In 1985, Brady died of respiratory failure in Los Angeles at the age of 60. He is interred at  Holy Cross Cemetery in Culver City.

Partial filmography

 The Counterfeiters (1948) - Jerry McGee
 Canon City (1948) - Jim Sherbondy
 In This Corner (1948) - Jimmy Weston
 He Walked by Night (1948) - Police Sgt. Marty Brennan
 The Gal Who Took the West (1949) - Lee O'Hara
 Port of New York (1949) - Michael 'Mickey' Waters
 Undertow (1949) - Tony Reagan
 I Was a Shoplifter (1950) - Jeff Andrews
 Undercover Girl (1950) - Lt. Michael Trent
 Kansas Raiders (1950) - Bill Anderson
 The Model and the Marriage Broker (1951) - Matt Hornbeck
 Bronco Buster (1952) - Bart Eaton
 Untamed Frontier (1952) - Glenn Denbow
 Yankee Buccaneer (1952) - Lt. David Farragut
 Montana Belle (1952) - Bob Dalton
 Bloodhounds of Broadway (1952) - Robert 'Numbers' Foster
 Three Steps to the Gallows (UK) / White Fire (US) (1953) - Gregor Stevens
 A Perilous Journey (1953) - Shard Benton
 El Alamein (1953) - Joe Banning 
 Johnny Guitar (1954) - Dancin' Kid
 The Law vs. Billy the Kid  (1954) - William 'Billy the Kid' Bonney
 They Were So Young (1954) - Richard Lanning
 Gentlemen Marry Brunettes (1955) - David Action
 The Vanishing American (1955) - Blandy
 Mohawk (1956) - Jonathan
 Terror at Midnight (1956) - Neal 'Rick' Rickards
 The Maverick Queen (1956) - Sundance
 The Storm Rider (1957) - Bart Jones
 The Restless Breed (1957) - Mitch
 Ambush at Cimarron Pass (1958) - Sgt. Matt Blake
 Blood Arrow (1958) - Dan Kree
 Battle Flame (1959) - 1st Lt. Frank Davis
 Operation Bikini (1963) - Capt. Emmett Carey
 Stage to Thunder Rock (1964) - Sam Swope
 John Goldfarb, Please Come Home! (1965) - Coach Sakalakis
 Black Spurs (1965) - Reverend Tanner
 Destination Inner Space (1966) - Cmdr. Wayne
 Castle of Evil (1966) - Matt Granger
 Red Tomahawk (1967) - Ep Wyatt
 Fort Utah (1967) - Dajin
 Journey to the Center of Time (1967) - Stanton
 Arizona Bushwhackers (1968) - Tom Rile
 The Road Hustlers (1968) - Earl Veasey
 They Ran for Their Lives (1968) - Joe Seely
 The Mighty Gorga (1969) - Dan Morgan
 Nightmare in Wax (1969) - Detective Haskell
 Satan's Sadists (1969) - Charlie Baldwin
 The Ice House (1969) - Lt. Scott
 The Cycle Savages (1969) - Vice Squad Detective (uncredited)
 Five Bloody Graves (1969) - Jim Wade
 Marooned (1969) - Public Affairs Officer
 Hell's Bloody Devils (1970) - Brand
 Cain's Cutthroats (1970) - Justice Cain
 Doctors' Wives (1971) - Sgt.Malloy
 $ (AKA: The Heist) (UK title) (1971) - Sarge
 The Loners (1972) - Policeman Hearn
 Bonnie's Kids (1972) - Ben
 The Leo Chronicles (1972)
 Wicked, Wicked (1973) - Police Sgt. Ramsey
 The Night Strangler (1973) - Police Captain Schubert
 Roll, Freddy, Roll! (1974, TV Movie) - Admiral Norton
 When Every Day Was the Fourth of July (1978, TV Movie) - Officer Michael Doyle
 Women in White (1979, TV Movie) - Bartender
 The China Syndrome (1979) - Herman De Young
 Strange Behavior (1981) - Shea
 McClain's Law (1981) - Capt. Scofield
 Gremlins (1984) - Sheriff Frank (final film role)

References

External links
 
 
 
 

1924 births
1985 deaths
American male film actors
American male television actors
American people of Irish descent
People from Brooklyn
People from Westchester County, New York
Male actors from New York City
Male actors from Los Angeles
Deaths from pulmonary fibrosis
Burials at Holy Cross Cemetery, Culver City
United States Navy sailors
United States Navy personnel of World War II
20th-century American male actors
Male Western (genre) film actors
Western (genre) television actors
Military personnel from New York City